Penrhiwfer (Welsh for "short hill end") is a village located in the community of Tonyrefail, Rhondda Cynon Taf County Borough, Wales.

There is a church, a park and a school.The Park is adjacent to the new school and the church is located on the main road.

Governance 
Penrhiwfer lies in the Tonyrefail West ward for elections to Rhondda Cynon Taf County Borough Council. As of 4 May 2017 its County Councillor is Alexandra Davies-Jones.

Penrhiwfer is also a community ward for elections to Tonyrefail & District Community Council. Its Community Councillors are Daniel Owen-Jones, and Andrew Davies-Jones.

References

Villages in Rhondda Cynon Taf
Wards of Rhondda Cynon Taf